Charles David Murray, Lord Murray  (20 October 1866 – 9 June 1936) was a Scottish Tory politician, lawyer and judge. He became Lord Advocate in 1922.

Life

He was born in London the son of David William Murray, a merchant.

Murray was educated at Edinburgh Academy and then studied aw at the University of Edinburgh, was admitted as an advocate in 1889 and appointed a King's Counsel in 1909. He was a Major in the Fourth Division of the Royal Engineers (Volunteers), resigning in 1907. He was on the War Office staff from 1915 to 1917, and was appointed a temporary Lieutenant Colonel and Director of National Service for Scotland in 1917. He was appointed a Companion of the Order of St Michael and St George (CMG; Military Division) in 1918. He became Sheriff of Renfrewshire and Buteshire in 1918, and was awarded an LLD by the University of Edinburgh in 1919.

Murray was an unsuccessful parliamentary candidate in Edinburgh South in 1910, but was elected for the seat in December 1918, holding it until October 1922. He was Dean of the Faculty of Advocates from 1919 to 1920, and was appointed Solicitor General for Scotland in March 1920. He was sworn of the Privy Council and promoted to Lord Advocate in March 1922, holding office until October of that year. He was then raised to the bench with the judicial title Lord Murray, where he served until his death in 1936.

In 1923 he was elected a Fellow of the Royal Society of Edinburgh. His proposers were Francis Gibson Baily, James Hartley Ashworth, Sir Francis Grant Ogilvie, Sir Edmund Taylor Whittaker and William A.P. Tait.

In later life he is listed as living at 62 Great King Street in Edinburgh's New Town, a large and impressive Georgian townhouse.

He became a deputy lieutenant of Fife in 1922.

He died in Edinburgh on 9 June 1936 and is buried in the central roundel in Warriston Cemetery.

Family

In 1896 he was married to Annie Florence Nicolson (1873–1968), and together they had four sons. Their eldest son, David Charles Graeme Murray, married the Comtesse Elena Maia Sollohub. Their second son, Crichton Gavin Murray died while a child, their third son, Keith Anderson Hope Murray (1903–1993), became Baron Murray of Newhaven, and his youngest son, Charles Dean Leslie Murray (1906–1972) was an advocate.

References

External links 
 

1866 births
1936 deaths
People educated at Edinburgh Academy
Alumni of the University of Edinburgh
Companions of the Order of St Michael and St George
Murray
Deans of the Faculty of Advocates
Lord Advocates
Solicitors General for Scotland
Unionist Party (Scotland) MPs
Members of the Parliament of the United Kingdom for Edinburgh constituencies
UK MPs 1918–1922
Royal Engineers officers
British Army personnel of World War I
Members of the Privy Council of the United Kingdom
Scottish King's Counsel
20th-century King's Counsel
Deputy Lieutenants of Fife
Scottish sheriffs